"No More Rhyme" is the eighth single by American singer-songwriter-actress Debbie Gibson, and the third from her second album Electric Youth (LP 81932). Produced and arranged by Fred Zarr, the single reached number 17 on the Billboard Hot 100 and number thirteen on the adult contemporary chart. It was her third ballad to be released as a single (following "Foolish Beat" and "Lost in Your Eyes").

The music video features The Wonder Years actress Danica McKellar playing a cello.  On the original recording, the cello soloist was Bob Osman.

Critical reception
Oscar Wednesday of Cashbox reacted on this record by following statement: "This tender ballad makes me want to lean over into little Debbie’s ear and whisper, ″How can I say doo-doo? Let me count the ways″."

Track listing

Chart history

Weekly charts

References

External links
 

1989 singles
1988 songs
1980s ballads
Debbie Gibson songs
Song recordings produced by Fred Zarr
Songs written by Debbie Gibson
Atlantic Records singles
Pop ballads